Mt. Olive Township (N½ T7N R6W) is located in Macoupin County, Illinois, United States. As of the 2010 census, its population was 3,274 and it contained 1,536 housing units.

Geography

Demographics

Adjacent townships
 Cahokia Township (north)
 South Litchfield Township, Montgomery County (northeast)
 Walshville Township, Montgomery County (east)
 Staunton Township (south)
 Dorchester Township (west)
 Gillespie Township (northwest)

References

External links
US Census
City-data.com
Illinois State Archives

Townships in Macoupin County, Illinois
Townships in Illinois